Henry Smith was a Bristol attorney-at-law and amateur artist who was forced to flee the country in 1809 after a duel in which he killed his opponent. His travels around Scotland and later Spain and Portugal during the Peninsula War (where he served in the army under Wellington) were recorded in a diary (1809–1810) which is today kept at the University of Kansas. He subsequently returned to the United Kingdom for trial, but was discharged without trial.

Early life 

Henry Smith was born on 28 December 1774 at Queens Square Bristol, the son of Richard Smith, surgeon and Augusta, the daughter of Rev. Alexander Stopford Catcott and sister of Rev Alexander Catcott.

References
 

Powell,Arthur C. and Littleton, Joseph "A History of Freemasonry in Bristol" (Bennett Brothers,1919)

British lawyers
Year of death missing
1774 births
19th-century British lawyers
British barristers
British Army personnel of the Peninsular War
English duellists